Sundén is a Swedish surname. On 31 December 2013, the number of people were residents Sweden with the spelling variants 

 Sundén 1 182
 Sundeen 12
Together, this name is shared by 1,194 people.

Notable people with the surname include:

Hjalmar Sundén (1908–1993), Swedish psychologist
Reijo Sundén (born 1941), Finnish rower

References